Mustafa Timisi (born 1 May 1936, Divriği, Sivas) was a Turkish Alevi politician, a leader of the Unity Party.

Early life and political activism 
Mustafa Timisi political career began probably with his opposition towards the inclusion of the Alevis in the so-called Circle of Islam by the Government of prime minister Ismet Inönü. Timisi and other students of Alevi origin at the Ankara University, organized themselves in 1963. They directed themselves to the press and Timisi read out a statement declaring that the Alevis supported Mustafa Kemal Atatürk and the National Struggle. The statement was viewed as a positive step by the Turkish president Cemal Gürsel, who invited members of the Alevi university students of which several later became active politicians to a meeting with him. But the Republican People's Party (CHP) approach to the Alevis was ambiguous and during the government of Süleyman Demirel, İbrahim Elmalı, the president of the Directorate of Religious Affairs at the time stated, “There is no such thing as Alevis,” which caused a strong opposition from the Alevis towards the Turkish Government.

Political career 
In 1966, the Unity Party was established by left-leaning Alevi politicians. During a general assembly held after the elections of 1969, Timisi was appointed as president of the party as the successor of Huseyin Balan. After the military coup of 12 March 1971, Timisi secured a seat in parliament for the Unity Party. During his tenure as a deputy of Turkish Grand National Assembly he was opposed to the hanging of Deniz Gezmiş and his accomplices and also directed a letter to  Cevdet Sunay, the president at the time, demanding their amnesty. Timisi and the Unity Party continued to be active in politics until the military coup in1980 during which the party was banned and he was shortly imprisoned in Istanbul together with Behice Boran. Following the coup, he was involved in several political parties such as the Social Democracy Party (SODEP) or the Social Democratic Populist Party (SHP) which later merged into the new CHP.

İş Bank 
In 1995, Timisi resigned from an active political career and began working for İş Bank as a member of the board of directors. He was replaced in 2002.

References 

Turkish politicians
1936 births
Living people
Ankara University alumni